Albert S. Porter (November 4, 1904 – January 7, 1979) was an American engineer and politician from Ohio.

Early life
Porter was born in Portsmouth, Virginia, to Albert S. and Lena Edmonds Porter. He moved with his family to Lakewood, Ohio in 1913, graduated from Lakewood High School in 1922 and from Ohio State University with his B.S. in civil engineering in 1928.

In 1929 he joined the Cleveland Highway Research Bureau, becoming chief assistant to county engineer John O. McWilliams in 1933 and served until 1943, when he succeeded him. He also served five years in United States Navy during World War II.

Political career
He was a Cuyahoga County engineer for 29 years (since 1943, defeated for reelection in 1976) and county Democratic party chairman for 6 years (1963–1969), and a delegate to the 1952, 1964 and 1972 Democratic National Conventions. During his tenure as county engineer much of the freeway system linking Cleveland to its suburbs was built.

Porter unsuccessfully sought the 1958 Democratic nominee for Governor of Ohio, losing decisively to Michael DiSalle. He is perhaps best remembered as an Ohio favorite-son candidate in both 1960 and 1964 Democratic presidential primaries. In 1960 he lost the Ohio primary to Governor DiSalle, carrying 39.75% to DiSalle's 60.25%. This placed him 8th in nationwide popular vote (3.52%) Four years later he was unopposed and carried the Ohio primary with 100%. and placed 6th nationwide (7.94%) As with other favorite sons that fall, he supported the reelection of President Lyndon B. Johnson.

Controversy and downfall
Porter planned to build a freeway, commonly referred to as the Clark Freeway, through the Shaker Lakes, a park that preserved a historic site. Once the Clark freeway was completed, a secondary freeway, the Lee freeway, would be built from I-480 to I-90.  The interchange between Clark and Lee freeways would replace the Shaker Nature center.  When a coalition of citizens' groups organized to fight this plan, Porter called the Shaker Lakes "a two-bit duck pond."

In May 1976 Beth Ann Louis, a twelve-year-old girl in Olmsted Falls, wrote to Porter as part of a school assignment, asking him not to replace the Bagley Road bridge because of the impact on wildlife and the environment. Porter replied to her with a disparaging letter that included several misspellings, calling Olmsted Falls residents "moochers, scroungers, chiselers and parasites." Public outrage resulted. In September 1976 a number of Porter's employees told The Plain Dealer in a series of articles authored by reporter Amos A. Kermisch that for years he had forced them to kick back two percent of their pay. That November he was defeated for reelection.

As a result of a grand jury investigation in 1977, which was launched following the articles in The Plain Dealer, Porter pleaded guilty to 19 counts of theft in office for the kickback scheme and was fined $10,000 and placed on probation for 2 years.

Personal life
Porter married Genevieve Shaveyco in 1949. They had two sons (Lee and Alan) and one daughter (Carol).

References

 Encyclopedia of Cleveland History Article on Porter

1904 births
1979 deaths
United States Navy personnel of World War II
People from Lakewood, Ohio
Ohio Democrats
Politicians from Cleveland
Politicians from Portsmouth, Virginia
Candidates in the 1960 United States presidential election
Candidates in the 1964 United States presidential election
20th-century American politicians
Ohio State University alumni